The Belle Court Apartments is a four-story building in northwest Portland, Oregon listed on the National Register of Historic Places.

See also
 National Register of Historic Places listings in Northwest Portland, Oregon

References

1912 establishments in Oregon
Individually listed contributing properties to historic districts on the National Register in Oregon
Northwest Portland, Oregon
Portland Historic Landmarks
Residential buildings completed in 1912
Apartment buildings on the National Register of Historic Places in Portland, Oregon
Tudor Revival architecture in Oregon